The women's Pole Vault at the 2014 IAAF World Indoor Championships took place on 9 March 2014.

Medalists

Records

Qualification standards

Schedule

Results

References

Pole Vault
Pole vault at the World Athletics Indoor Championships
2014 in women's athletics